Marabadiassa is a town in central Ivory Coast. It is a sub-prefecture of Béoumi Department in Gbêkê Region, Vallée du Bandama District. The town sits less than one kilometre south of the border of Woroba District.

Marabadiassa was a commune until March 2012, when it became one of 1126 communes nationwide that were abolished.

In 2014, the population of the sub-prefecture of Marabadiassa was 6,640 6,640.

Villages
The 9 villages of the sub-prefecture of Marabadiassa and their population in 2014 are

 Allokokro (501)
 Blimplo (314)
 Goli-Maya (1 417)
 Kpetessou (222)
 Mangoua-Okoukro (601)
 Marabadjassa (2 289)
 Plikro (511)
 Toudjan 1 (274)
 Toudjan 2 (511)

Notes

Sub-prefectures of Gbêkê
Former communes of Ivory Coast